Colias behrii, the Behr's sulphur or Sierra green sulfur, is a butterfly in the  family Pieridae. It is endemic to California's Sierra Nevada from Tuolumne County south to Tulare County.

The upper surface of the males is dull green with a dark border and with a pale hindwing cell spot. Females are greenish-yellow with a dark diffuse border. The underside of both sexes is green. Adults are on wing from July to August. They feed on flower nectar. Its habitats include moist alpine and subalpine meadows surrounded by low shrubs.

The larvae feed on Vaccinium species and Gentiana newberryi.

References

behrii
Butterflies described in 1866
Butterflies of North America
Taxa named by William Henry Edwards